Thomas Burdett Money-Coutts, 7th Baron Latymer (6 August 1901 – 24 May 1987) was an English peer. He inherited the title Baron Latymer from his father, Hugh Burdett Money-Coutts, 6th Baron Latymer.

Money-Coutts was educated at Radley College and Trinity College, Oxford. A banker by profession, he was also for forty years Vice Chairman of the board for the Middlesex Hospital. In 1925 he married Patience née Courtenay-Thompson: they had two daughters and one son, his heir Hugo.

References 

1901 births
1987 deaths
People educated at Radley College
Alumni of Trinity College, Oxford
English bankers
Barons Latimer
20th-century English businesspeople
20th-century English nobility